The Magnificents may refer to:

Johnny Keyes and the Magnificents, a 1950s doo-wop vocal group
The Magnificents (Scottish band), a Scottish electro rock band 
The Magnificents (album), their debut album

See also
Magnificent (disambiguation)
The Magnificent (disambiguation)
Magnificence (disambiguation)